Gort GAA Club is a Gaelic Athletic Association (GAA) club located in Gort, County Galway, Ireland. Founded at the turn of the 20th century, the club is almost exclusively concerned with the game of hurling. The club competes in Galway GAA competitions, and has won the Galway Senior Hurling Club Championship and Connacht Senior Club Hurling Championship on several occasions.

History
While hurling has been played in Gort since at least the formation of the GAA in the 1880s, the modern club was formed at the turn of the 20th century. The club won its first Galway Senior Hurling Championship (Galway SHC) in 1914, going on to win several other titles.

After winning the 1983 Galway SHC, the club reached the 1984 All-Ireland Senior Club Hurling Championship Final, losing in a replay to Ballyhale Shamrocks GAA.

In November 2011, Gort won their first Galway Senior Hurling final since 1983 with a 0–17 to 1–12 win against Clarinbridge. Gort won their next Senior Galway title in 2014, and went on to represent Connacht in the 2014–15 All-Ireland Senior Club Hurling Championship.

Hurling titles
 Connacht Senior Club Hurling Championship (2): 1982, 1984
 Galway Senior Hurling Championship (7): 1914, 1916, 1934, 1981, 1983, 2011, 2014

Notable players
 John Commins
 Richie Cummins
 Ollie Fahy
 Josie Gallagher
 Jack Grealish
 Aidan Harte
 Tom Helebert
 Greg Lally
 Sylvie Linnane
 Pearse Piggott
 Gerard Quinn

References

External links
Gort GAA site

Gaelic games clubs in County Galway
Hurling clubs in County Galway